Gyeongnam Art Museum is an art museum in Changwon, South Korea. Initial planning began in 1998, and the museum opened on June 23, 2004.

References

External links
 

Art museums and galleries in South Korea
Buildings and structures in Changwon